Scott Lincoln (born 7 May 1993) is an English athlete specialising in the shot put. He is a six-time British champion.

He became a six times British champion when winning the shot put event at the 2020 British Athletics Championships with a throw of 19.65 metres. He won Bronze in the 2022 Commonwealth Games in Birmingham.

References

Living people
1993 births
English male shot putters
British male shot putters
British Athletics Championships winners
Athletes (track and field) at the 2020 Summer Olympics
Olympic athletes of Great Britain
Commonwealth Games bronze medallists for England
Commonwealth Games medallists in athletics
Athletes (track and field) at the 2022 Commonwealth Games
Medallists at the 2022 Commonwealth Games